Events in the year 1713 in Norway.

Incumbents
Monarch: Frederick IV

Events
19 September - Frederik Krag is appointed Vice Steward of Norway.
Selbo Copper Works (later incorporated into Meraker Brug) was established.

Births
Johan Henrik Freithoff, violinist and composer (died in 1767).

Deaths

11 April – Anne Clausdatter, businesswoman and owner of Borgestad Manor in Skien (born 1659)

See also

References